Umayyad Square ( / ALA-LC: sāḥat al-Umawiyīn) is a large and important square in Damascus, Syria. It connects the city center with several important highways and areas and contains various important buildings including but not limited to the Ministry of Defense, Syria's national Opera house and the headquarters of the Syrian Armed Forces.

The Damascene Sword monument, widely considered as the symbol of the city, stands in the square, and is considered a symbol and reminder "of the victories, strength and achievements of the Syrian people". The name of the square is a reference to the Umayyads who took Damascus as the capital of their caliphate in the 7th century.

On 20 June 2011 a massive pro-President al-Assad rally was held in the square as well as in Homs, Aleppo, Sweida, Latakia, Deraa, Hasaka, Tartous as well other locations during the Syrian civil war.

Prior to the opening of the new 1.2 million sqm fairground to house the Damascus International Fair, the fair which was held annually since 1954 (before being cancelled in 2012 and reopening in 2017) was held in the square.

Streets
The Umayyad square is connected with seven of the city's most important streets and highways:
Beirut Street, which connects Damascus to the capital of Lebanon, Beirut
Jawaharlal Nehru street, named after Jawaharlal Nehru, former prime minister of India
Adnan al-Malki street, named after Adnan al-Malki, a Syrian Army officer and major 20th century political figure
Mehdi Ben Barka street, named after Mehdi Ben Barka, a Moroccan politician
Shukri al-Quwatli street, one of the city's most important streets, named after Shukri al-Quwatli, first president of an independent Syria
Abu Bakr street, named after Rashidun caliph Abu Bakr
Fayez Mansour street, named after Syrian Colonel Fayez Mansour who aced 14 victories against the Israeli Air Force

Buildings on the Umayyad Square

 Damascus Opera House complex, which includes the Higher Institute for Dramatic Arts.
 Al-Assad National Library, Malki Street
 Syrian Television building.
 the Hay'at al-Arkan, the Syrian Armed Forces General staff headquarters.
 Ministry of Defense.
 Sheraton Damascus Hotel.

References

External links

Squares in Damascus